24:00 is the third extended play (EP) by English singer Neon Hitch. It was released on 1 March 2015 by WeRNeon.

Songs 
Hitch says that "On the Run" is a "ghetto gypsy swag song." "Get Me High" has "soothing melodies" that "will seriously get you high" and "offers the listener a feeling of tranquility, even if it’s just a mental high." "Back Against the Wall" is a "jolting anthem for standing up for what’s right," while "Lost at Sea" brings out Hitch’s "marvellous vocal ability and her fanciful gift for beautiful songwriting."

Track listing

References 

2015 EPs
Neon Hitch albums
Pop music EPs